Alfsen is a surname. Notable people with the surname include:

Edin Cornelius Alfsen (1896–1966), Norwegian-American Lutheran missionary
Ellen Alfsen (born 1965), Norwegian politician
Erik Alfsen (1930–2019), Norwegian mathematician
Martin Alfsen (born 1959), Norwegian musician